André Clóvis Silva Filho (born 21 November 1997), commonly known as André Clóvis, is a Brazilian footballer who plays for Portuguese club Académico de Viseu, on loan from Estoril, as a forward.

Personal life
He is a twin brother of Anderson Silva.

Career statistics

Club

References

1997 births
Footballers from São Paulo
Twin sportspeople
Living people
Brazilian footballers
Association football forwards
Guaratinguetá Futebol players
Sport Club Internacional players
Portimonense S.C. players
Leixões S.C. players
G.D. Estoril Praia players
Académico de Viseu F.C. players
Campeonato Brasileiro Série B players
Campeonato Brasileiro Série C players
Primeira Liga players
Liga Portugal 2 players
Brazilian expatriate footballers
Brazilian expatriate sportspeople in Portugal
Expatriate footballers in Portugal